The 2022–23 Santosh Trophy was the 76th edition of the Santosh Trophy, the premier competition in India for senior men's football teams representing their respective states/union territories and government institutions.

Contrary to the recent seasons, this edition onwards the AIFF adopted a new format for the tournament that saw the removal of the qualification stage, thereby allowing all the state teams to participate in the group stage. This move taken in a way for promoting the sport in every region of the country. On 6 October 2022, the AIFF signed a MoU with the SAFF, which included an agreement to host the semi-finals, the 3rd place decider & the final in Riyadh, Saudi Arabia.

Group stage

The group stage was contested by 36 teams representing the states and the union territories of India, wherein the teams were drawn into six groups. The six group winners, along with three best runner-up teams qualified for the final round along with Railways, Services and the host of the round.

Group I

Group II

Group III

Group IV

Group V

Group VI

Ranking of runner-up teams

Draw
The official draw for the 76th edition of Santosh Trophy was held on 19 January 2023 at the AIFF headquarters- the Football House, in New Delhi with AIFF Secretary General Dr. Shaji Prabhakaran assisting in the process. Nine teams who came through the qualifiers along with Services, Railways and the host of the final round - Odisha, were drawn into two groups of six each for the round beginning from 10 February. The host venue of the event was announced to be Bhubaneswar.

Final round

Group A

Group B

Knockout stage

Bracket

Semi-finals

Third place

Final

Statistics

Awards

See also
2023 National Beach Soccer Championship
2022–23 Futsal Club Championship

References

External links

2022–23 Santosh Trophy
Santosh Trophy seasons
Santosh Trophy